Léonie Yahne (August 8, 1867 – April 26, 1950) was a French comedic actress.

Early life
Marie Léonie Jahn was born at Versailles, France. She used a different spelling of her surname professionally, to reflect its pronunciation.

Career

Yahne was an actress on the Paris stage for most of her career, which lasted from about 1884 to 1917. Her stage roles included Lucienne in Monsieur l'Abbé (1891), Roxane in Cyrano de Bergerac (1900), opposite Benoît-Constant Coquelin,  the title part in Catulle Mendès's La Reine Fiammette (1898), Huguette in Famille (1901). and Adinolfa in Impressions d'Afrique (1912). In 1895, Henri de Toulouse-Lautrec drew her with her co-stars André Antoine and Henry Mayer in L'Age Difficile. She also appeared in at least one silent film short, Le duel de Max (1913) with Max Linder.

In 1911 she won a lawsuit against another Parisian actress calling herself "Yane", preventing the other woman from using a stage name that so closely resembled her own. An English magazine referred to Yahne as "a favorite in society, an expert with foils, a passionate horsewoman, and a terror of France on her automobile."

Personal life
Léonie Yahne owned a property in Louveciennes, named Villa Fiammette after one of her best-known roles.  She died in Paris in 1950, aged 82 years.

References

External links
 
 A pencil sketch by Henri de Toulouse-Lautrec, "Léonie Yahne in her dressing room, in L'Age Difficile" (1895), in the collection of the Metropolitan Museum of Art.

1867 births
1950 deaths
French actresses